Steinbeis-Hochschule Berlin (SHB) (or Steinbeis University) is a private German university of applied sciences founded in 1998. The university is based in Berlin and has supplementary campuses in Baden-Württemberg.

The university mainly offers extra-occupational study courses in economics. It offers Bachelor's, Master's, and doctorate programs.

The university is wholly owned by the Steinbeis Foundation.

History 

As early as 1994, the Steinbeis Foundation was working on the fundamentals of a new academy. The idea of a private Steinbeis University in Baden-Württemberg was soon in coming. The circumstances at the time, however, were not advantageous. As a result, Johann Löhn, the then chairman of the board, chose not to pursue the idea further.

The Secretary of State at the time, Erich Thies, was a strong advocate of the university. After discussion with the Berlin State Senate, Steinbeis received state approval to move forward with SHB. The university opened in autumn of 1998 offering the MBE (Master of Business and Engineering).

1999 saw the introduction of the MedienMBA, the first MBA for senior managers working in the German media. In 2000 SHB added MBA degrees for Chinese executives and German fast-track employees. In 2001 SHB launched its first bachelor's degree program.

The university is organized as a business, with the institutes acting more like "companies within a company". Degrees based on this model require students to "partner" with a company at the start of their studies and create a project that applies learned knowledge to a realistic business challenge.

Over 4000 employed professionals are enrolled in SHB.

Criticism

At the beginning of 2014, the university received nationwide criticism after it announced plans to launch a Steinbeis Transfer Institute in Traunstein in September 2014 offering a bachelor's degree in homeopathy. Critics called it a "disgrace for the science center of Bavaria". According to the Society for the Scientific Investigation of Pseudoscience (GWUP) the course is "simply an academic misnomer."
After a reconstruction of the Steinbeis University overall, study degrees were strictly controlled by the Steinbeis University and study courses like the bachelor's degree in homeopathy were banned from the program 

According to the journalist Weymayr, from the Christian Science Monitor, the program was a "training school for medical practitioners" which "glosses over an academic cloak upgraded" with dignity. You talk "from the master and bachelor of college, of, academic, '" says "all the serious degree programs that are committed to academic standards and are based on normal universities, discredited." The physician Edzard Ernst stated that the programme "does not even meet the minimum of critical thinking and academic integrity". He added that the implementation of such courses was "extremely regrettable - they devalue the Bachelor of Science in all other areas and have nothing to do with science." Against the accreditation of the degree program a petition to the Senate of Berlin was directed that the college is responsible.

At the beginning of April 2014, Spiegel Online stated that the proposed course of study will not be introduced.

Study programs 
 Master of Business Engineering (MBE) – (General Management, Business Intelligence)
 Master of Arts (MA)
 Master of Laws (LL.M.)
 Master of Business Administration (MBA)
 Master of Science (M.Sc.) 
 Bachelor of Arts (BA)
 Bachelor of Business Administration (BBA) 
 Bachelor of Engineering (B.Eng.) 
 Bachelor of Science (B.Sc.)
Until this university of applied sciences lost its right to award doctorates in 2016, it offered doctoral programs (PhD or the German PhD equivalent Dr. rer. oec.). Since then, doctoral programs have continued to be offered, but always in cooperation with and with a degree certificate from partner universities in other European countries.

Institutes
 Steinbeis Center of Management and Technology (SCMT) 
 School of Management and Technology (SMT)
 Stuttgart Institute of Management and Technology (SIMT)
 Steinbeis Institute of Executive Capabilities (IEC) 
 Steinbeis Business Academy (SBA)
 School of International Business and Entrepreneurship (SIBE) 
 School of Management and Innovation (SMI) 
 School of Governance Risk & Compliance (School GRC)  
 IBR School of Executive Management
 ISW Business School Freiburg
 Berlin School of Creative Leadership

References

External links
 Homepage of Steinbeis-University

Private universities and colleges in Germany
 
Universities and colleges in Berlin